David Baillie (June 28, 1928 – November 25, 1977) was a Canadian weightlifter who is best known for earning the silver medal at the 1954 and 1958 Commonwealth Games in the superheavyweight category. Baillie competed at the 1956 and 1960 Olympic Games finishing in 6th place each time.

References

1928 births
1977 deaths
Canadian male weightlifters
Olympic weightlifters of Canada
Weightlifters at the 1952 Summer Olympics
Weightlifters at the 1956 Summer Olympics
Weightlifters at the 1960 Summer Olympics
Weightlifters at the 1954 British Empire and Commonwealth Games
Weightlifters at the 1958 British Empire and Commonwealth Games
Commonwealth Games silver medallists for Canada
Canadian strength athletes
Place of birth missing
Commonwealth Games medallists in weightlifting
20th-century Canadian people
Medallists at the 1954 British Empire and Commonwealth Games
Medallists at the 1958 British Empire and Commonwealth Games